Aq Darreh or Aqdarreh may refer to:
 Aq Darreh, East Azerbaijan
 Aq Darreh, Ahar, East Azerbaijan Province
 Aq Darreh, Hamadan
 Aqdarreh, Markazi
 Aqdarreh-ye Olya, West Azerbaijan Province
 Aqdarreh-ye Sofla, West Azerbaijan Province
 Aqdarreh-ye Vosta, West Azerbaijan Province